Fernando Abril Martorell (31 August 1936 – 16 February 1998) was a Spanish politician and agricultural engineer.

Biography
Born in Valencia, Spain, in 1936,  he studied Agricultural Engineering and Political Sciences in Madrid, later obtaining a doctorate in both. In 1969 he was named a president of the Diputación Provincial de Segovia (Provincial Delegation of Segovia) and was appointed a civil governor by Adolfo Suárez. After this, he was a technical director of the FORPPA (1971-1972) and a director of general Agrarian Production (1972-1974). He was appointed a Minister of Agriculture in Spain from (1976-1977), a member of the Senate (1977-1979), and he was one of the founders of Unión de Centro Democrático (Union Democratic Center) (UCD). He was elected regional president of it in Valencia Province. He was the third Vice-president of the government for Political Subjects (1977-1978) and the second vice president Minister of Economy (1978-1980). He was one of the writers of the 1978 Constitution.

Fernando Abril was also president of the Naval Union of the East (controlled by the Central bank) and vice-president of the Hispanic Central bank (1991).

In June 1990, following a proposal by Felipe González, of the Commission of Analysis and Evaluation of the National System of Health, created by the Ministry of Health, he was involved in initial discussions of reforms in the Spanish sanitary system, particularly in Madrid.

He died in Madrid, on 16 February 1998, of lung cancer.

References

1936 births
1998 deaths
People from Valencia
Members of the 1st Congress of Deputies (Spain)
Politicians from the Valencian Community
20th-century Spanish engineers
Deaths from lung cancer in Spain
Union of the Democratic Centre (Spain) politicians
Agriculture ministers of Spain
Deputy Prime Ministers of Spain
Economy and finance ministers of Spain